Drammensveien is a street in Oslo, Norway, and a highway between the cities Oslo and Drammen. The highway is the heaviest trafficked road in Norway. The original road Drammensveien was built for transport from Oslo to the foundry Bærums Verk and the silver mines at Kongsberg.

References

Roads in Oslo
Streets in Oslo